Carlos Roberto Ferreira Cabral (born 2 January 1945) is a Brazilian football manager nicknamed Cabralzinho who last managed Espérance of Tunisia, a position he held from May 2008 to November 2008. He previously managed Espérance in 2007.

Career

Playing career
Cabralzinho played for Santos, São Bento, Fluminense, Palmeiras and Bangu, with which he won the state championship of Rio de Janeiro, the Campeonato Carioca of 1966. He was also part of the Bangu side that participated in 1967 under the name of Houston Stars in the championship of the United Soccer Association.

Management career
He began his coaching career in 1979, and previous clubs include Santos in Brazil (1995) and Zamalek in Egypt for two spells - between 2002 and 2003 and between 2004 and 2005. While at Zamalek he reportedly turned down offers from rivals Al-Ahly, as well as the Egyptian national side.

September 2009 Cabral named Al-Ittihad Al-Sakndary new coach after the sacking of Egyptian coach Taha Basry, His first match was against former team Zamalek.

Honors

As a manager
Zamalek SC
 CAF Champions League (1): 2002
 CAF Super Cup (1): 2003
Egyptian Premier League (1): 02-2003
Egyptian Super Cup (1): 2002

References

1945 births
Living people
Brazilian footballers
Brazilian football managers
Expatriate football managers in Qatar
Expatriate football managers in Egypt
Brazilian expatriate sportspeople in Egypt
Expatriate football managers in Saudi Arabia
Campeonato Brasileiro Série A managers
Santos FC players
Esporte Clube São Bento players
Bangu Atlético Clube players
Fluminense FC players
Sociedade Esportiva Palmeiras players
CR Flamengo footballers
Santa Helena Esporte Clube managers
Esporte Clube São Bento managers
Al-Arabi SC (Qatar) managers
Mogi Mirim Esporte Clube managers
Al-Shamal SC managers
Qatar national football team managers
Santos FC managers
Associação Portuguesa de Desportos managers
Guarani FC managers
Club Athletico Paranaense managers
Goiás Esporte Clube managers
São José Esporte Clube managers
Al Ain FC managers
L.D.U. Quito managers
Al-Ahli Saudi FC managers
Al-Qadisiyah FC managers
Figueirense FC managers
Zamalek SC managers
Campinense Clube managers
Espérance Sportive de Tunis managers
Al Ittihad Alexandria Club managers
Association football forwards